Atiq Square or Atigh Square or Kohneh Square or Old Square, in Persian:(میدان عتيق or  میدان کهنه) was a focal point of the city of Isfahan for centuries. In the eleventh century when Isfahan was the capital of the Seljuk dynasty, it was the main square and the chief center of the business and social life of the city. It was an important central focus of the city until Naqsh-e Jahan Square was laid out in the 17th centenary. But even at that time, the Kohneh Square preserved its importance as the center of the city's minor activities. With the Jameh Mosque on the north, Qeysarieh Bazaar on the west, Harun Velayat Mausoleum and the Ali Mosque on the south, and the Seljuk palaces on the east, the Kohneh Square served as a prototype for majestic Naqsh-e Jahan Square that Shah Abbas I created in its vicinity.

References

 

Squares in Iran
Islamic architecture
Architecture in Iran
Buildings and structures in Isfahan
Tourist attractions in Isfahan